For Loving You is a studio album released by the American country music artists Bill Anderson and Jan Howard in February 1968 on Decca Records. The album was their first collaborative album, setting the trend for a series of studio albums over the next few years. The album's title track, "For Loving You", was the lead single and became a number 1 hit on the Billboard country songs chart.

Background and content
For Loving You was recorded in several sessions between 1965 and 1967 in two separate studios, Bradley's Barn and the Columbia Recording Studio. All sessions took place in Nashville, Tennessee. The sessions were produced by Owen Bradley, whom had previously collaborated with both Anderson and Howard. The album consisted of 11 tracks. Several of them were cover versions of songs recorded by other artists. Among these was Johnny Cash's "I Walk the Line", Bing Crosby's "Have I Told You Lately That I Love You?" and Don Robertson's "Born to Be with You". Among the new songs was the title track. The album was the first collaboration between Anderson and Howard, both of whom had been recording separately for the Decca label during the 1960s.

Release and reception
For Loving You was officially released in February 1968 by Decca Records in a vinyl record format. Six songs appeared on side one and five songs appeared on side two of the record. The album reached a peak position of 6 on the Billboard Top Country Albums chart in March 1968. The album's only single was the title track, which was released in late 1967. It peaked at number 1 on the Billboard Hot Country Singles chart in December 1967. The song was Anderson's third number 1 single and Howard's only number 1. It also peaked at number 9 on the Canadian RPM Country Tracks chart.

For Loving You received positive reviews from critics. Greg Adams of Allmusic gave the release 3 out of 5 stars, calling it "thematic", but criticized the lack of material from Anderson, who is a "talented and prolific songwriter".

Track listing

Personnel
All credits are adapted from the liner notes of For Loving You.

Musical and technical personnel
 Bill Anderson – lead vocals
 Harold Bradley – guitar
 Owen Bradley – producer
 Floyd Cramer – piano
 Ray Edenton – guitar
 Jan Howard – lead vocals
 Roy Huskey – bass
 The Jordanaires – background vocals
 Jimmy Lance – guitar
 Len Miller – drums
 Hal Rugg – steel guitar
 Jerry Shook – guitar
 Jerry Smith – piano

Chart performance

Release history

References

1967 albums
Bill Anderson (singer) albums
Jan Howard albums
Albums produced by Owen Bradley
Decca Records albums
Vocal duet albums